Michael I served as Greek Patriarch of Alexandria between 860 and 870.

References

9th-century Patriarchs of Alexandria
9th-century Christian clergy